Caryocolum peregrinella is a moth of the family Gelechiidae. It is found in northern Spain, the southern Alps (France, Italy, Slovenia and Austria), Bosnia and Herzegovina, North Macedonia and Greece.

The length of the forewings is 7.5–8 mm for males and 7.5–9 mm for females. The forewings are blackish with scattered white scales. There is a small white spot at the base. The hindwings are bright nacreous (resembling mother of pearl). Adults have been recorded on wing from mid-July to mid-September.

The larvae feed on the leaves of Silene ciliata and Petrocoptis pyrenaica. They feed at the base of their host plant amongst silken spinnings covered with green frass. The larvae have a dull ochreous yellow or dull greenish yellow body and a black head. Pupation takes place in a white silken cocoon covered with green frass, spun amongst stems at the base of the host plant. Larvae can be found in mid-June.

References

Moths described in 1854
peregrinella
Moths of Europe